Dick James (born Reginald Leon Isaac Vapnick; 12 December 1920 – 1 February 1986) was a British music publisher and singer. He and Brian Epstein established the Beatles' publisher Northern Songs. Later, with his son Stephen, James founded the DJM record label and recording studios, which signed Elton John and Bernie Taupin.

Early life
James was born on 12 December 1920 in the East End of London, to Polish Jewish immigrants. His father was a kosher butcher. He sang with North London dance bands in his early teens, and was a regular vocalist at the Cricklewood Palais by the age of seventeen. James joined the Henry Hall band, and made first radio broadcast in 1940, but joined the Army in 1942. After World War II he continued to sing with leading bands, including Geraldo's. Later still, James was also a part-time member of The Stargazers, a popular early 1950s vocal group. In the 1950s he often appeared in the top ten Melody Maker vocal charts alongside the likes of Dickie Valentine and Frank Holder.

He was the singer of the theme songs of The Adventures of Robin Hood and The Buccaneers, from British television in the 1950s, and was a friend and associate of the record producer George Martin.

Switch to publishing
James entered the music publishing business as his singing career tapered off. In 1958 he joined Sidney Bron Music as a song-plugger but decided to leave and open Dick James Music in 1961. In early 1963, he was contacted by Brian Epstein who was looking for a publisher for the second Beatles single, "Please Please Me". James called Philip Jones, producer of the TV show Thank Your Lucky Stars, played the record down the phone to him and secured the band's first nationwide television appearance. The pair subsequently established Northern Songs Ltd., with Beatles John Lennon and Paul McCartney, to publish Lennon and McCartney's original songs (fellow Beatles George Harrison and Ringo Starr were also signed to Northern Songs as songwriters, but did not renew their contracts in 1968). James's company, Dick James Music, administered Northern Songs.

What initially began as an amicable working relationship between the Beatles and James disintegrated by the late 1960s: the Beatles considered that James had betrayed and taken advantage of them when he sold Northern Songs in 1969 without offering the band an opportunity to buy control of the publishing company. James profited handsomely from the sale of Northern Songs, but the Beatles never again had the rights to their own songs.

During the 1960s, James also handled Billy J. Kramer and Gerry and the Pacemakers. James lived in Anson Road, Cricklewood, north-west London, in the 1960s. He was involved, along with Brian Epstein, in offering Bobby Willis a singing contract which he turned down on his future wife, Cilla Black's, insistence. Willis was a backing singer on Cilla Black's "You're My World".

Later days
James signed Elton John (then known as Reginald Dwight) and his lyricist Bernie Taupin as untried unknowns in 1967 after his son Stephen, who had been working with his father since 1963, found Dwight using their recording studios late at night without permission. Stephen, who had started the recording studios and opened a record production company called This Productions, formed DJM Records in 1969.  Stephen instigated Dwight's adoption of the stage name "Elton John" and oversaw his first recording contract.  All of John's releases up to 1976 were issued on the DJM record label. The label also carried Jasper Carrott, RAH Band, Danny Kirwan, and John Inman.

John formed his own Rocket label in 1973, but in 1982, he was involved in a court case with James about royalties. In June 1985, the British music magazine NME reported that John was suing James over the rights to his earlier material – a case which John lost.

Death
James died in London of a heart attack on 1 February 1986, at the age of 65. Dick James Music was acquired by PolyGram which was, in turn, bought by Universal Music Group. The Dick James catalog is currently part of Universal Music Publishing Group.

UK chart hits
"Robin Hood"/"The Ballad of Davy Crockett" (1956) – number 14
"Garden of Eden" (1957) – number 18

Notes

References
 
 Oxford Dictionary of National Biography

External links

'Robin Hood' song connections webpage
Detailed website concerning Beatles song rights, including Dick James references
James mini-biography at the Musicweb site
beatlesbible.com bio

British Army personnel of World War II
English male singers
English Jews
Jewish singers
English music publishers (people)
English record producers
Elton John
1920 births
1986 deaths
British music industry executives
20th-century English singers
English people of Polish-Jewish descent
King's Own Yorkshire Light Infantry soldiers
British Parachute Regiment soldiers
20th-century English businesspeople
20th-century British male singers